The 6th Adelaide Film Festival took place in Adelaide, Australia, from 10 to 20 October 2013. This was Amanda Duthie's first year as Festival Director (after eight years at the Australian Broadcasting Corporation and eight years at the Special Broadcasting Service during the 1990s), having taken over from Katrina Sedgwick. Margaret Pomeranz and David Stratton served as the festival's patrons.

Scott Hicks received the 2013 Don Dunstan Award for his contribution to the Australian film industry.

The poster this year depicts Screen Worship, which celebrates work for all screens—cinema, television, phone and computer.

Development
The 2013 festival "ran alongside the Adelaide Festival of Ideas for the first time, with a move from 'mad March' to mid October".

The festival featured 166 titles from 48 countries, including 28 world premieres, 47 Australian premieres and 34 South Australian projects. The line-up included 14 works (including seven features) which were supported by the Adelaide Film Festival Investment Fund.

The festival opened with Tracks and "with no less than two camels on the red carpet with Robyn Davidson, the author of the book on which John Curran’s film is based". The festival closed with A Story of Children and Film directed by Mark Cousins.

The Turkish film Jin, directed and written by Reha Erdem, was the winner of the Foxtel Movies International Award for Best Feature Film. This was the first time the Adelaide Film Festival offered a Best Documentary Award. It was sponsored by Flinders University and the inaugural award went to Blush of Fruit.

Competition

Juries
The following people were selected for the Foxtel Movies International Feature Jury:
 Al Clark, Australian producer (President)
 Liz Watts, Australian producer 
 Wayne Blair, Australian writer/actor
 Lawrence Weschler, American art and film writer 
 Maryanne Redpath, Berlinale Delegate for Australia and New Zealand

The Flinders University Best Documentary Jury consisted of:
 Joost Den Hartog
 Cherelle Zheng
 Kristy Matheson

In Competition
The following films were selected for the In Competition section:

Awards
The International Award for Best Feature Film
The International Award for Best Feature Film was won by the Turkish film Jin, directed and written by Reha Erdem.

The Best Documentary Award
The Best Documentary Award was won by the Vietnamese/Australian film Blush of Fruit.

Audience Award
The Audience Award for Most Popular Feature was won by Charlie's Country.

The Audience Award for Most Popular Documentary was won by Once My Mother.

The Audience Award for Most Popular Short was won by The Gallant Captain.

Don Dunstan Award
The Don Dunstan Award was won by Scott Hicks.

References

External links
 Official Website

Adelaide Film Festival
Adelaide Film Festival
2010s in Adelaide
Adelaide Film Festival